The Filip Trade Collection (Croatian: Zbirka Filip Trade) is a large private collection of contemporary Croatian art. The collection is a subsidiary of Filip Trade, a distribution company with its offices located in the capital city of Croatia, Zagreb. The offices and collection are currently undergoing a move and will soon be relocated in a purpose built venue in the Črnomerec district of Zagreb, Croatia. The collection was founded in the nineties with the acquisition of the Drystone Walls graphic by artist Oton Gliha, an acquisition suggested by the Croatian art critic and connoisseur Radovan Beck. Nowadays, the collection holds works of Croatian artists created from the 1950s, up to today. The earliest piece in the collection dates back to 1949 and is the bronze sculpture Bara with a Chicken by the Croatian sculptor Ivan Kožarić. 
 
In the past several years the Collection has been more focused on the current production of artists of a younger and middle generation. The collection keeps longstanding relationships with some artists. For example, the collection has 33 works over a 12-year relationship with the Croatian painter Lovro Artuković. However the collection is also continually accepting new artists, in the last year 4 new artists were brought into the collection Silvia Sofija, Andreja Kulunčić, Silvo Šarić and the youngest artist in the collection, Igor Ruf, born 1984. The collection also has significant works from the artists involved in key periods and groups in Croatian art history, for example Exat 51, New Tendencies, Gorgona Group and Informel.
 
The collection is very involved in the contemporary art scene of Croatia. The Filip Trade award was distributed yearly from 2002 until 2005 to a young emerging Croatian artist. In 2002 the Filip Trade award was given to David Maljković, in 2003 the winner of the award was Matko Vekić, Kristian Kožul was the recipient in 2004 and in 2005 the Filip Trade award was presented to Viktor Popović. The collection has also worked with artists, independent artist associations and cultural institutions to organise various art projects and exhibitions throughout Europe. For example, the Filip Trade Collection organised a number of independent exhibitions which comprised the Linienstrasse113 project, organised in Berlin. The collection also regularly holds an exhibition hosted by Gallery 5 Kula at the yearly Motovun Film Festival in Istria, Croatia. They have also supported the publication of the artist book, Data book on Hydrocarbons, by one of their featured artists who works under the name, Puma 34.

List of artists represented in the Filip Trade Collection

Stanko Abadžić
Marina Abramović
Getulio Alviani
Lovro Artuković
Damir Babi
Željko Badurina
Gordana Bakić
Vojin Bakić
Breda Beban
Milivoj Bijelić
Tomislav Brajnović
Gordana Bralić
Ante Brkan
Stojan Ćelić
Boris Cvjetanović
Radomir Damnjanović Damnjan 
Boris Demur
Braco Dimitrijević
Juraj Dobrović
Zlatan Dumanić
Dušan Džamonja
Eugen Feller
Ivan Fijolić
Ivana Franke
Mladen Galić
Ivo Gattin
Vilko Gecan
Grubimiks Labyrinth 
Boris Guina
Tina Gverović
Stanko Herceg
Oskar Herman
Vlatka Horvat
Nina Ivančić
Nikolina Ivezić
Ratko Janjić-Jobo 
Paulina Jazvić
Anto Jerković
Željko Jerman
Marijan Jevšovar
Duje Jurić
Albert Kinert
Željko Kipke
Josip Klarica
Julije Knifer
Zlatko Kopljar
Alem Korkut
Daniel Kovač
Nikola Koydl
Ivan Kožarić
Kristian Kozul
Ines Krasić
Vlado Kristl
Andreja Kulunčić
Julio Le Parc
Kristina Lenard
Zvonimir Lončarić
Siniša Majkus
David Maljković
Dimitrije Bašičević, (Working under the name, Mangelos)
Antun Maračić
Ines Matijević Cakić 
Kata Mijatović
Jadranka Mlinar
Marijana Muljević
Sofija Naletilić Penavuša
Damir Očko
Ljubo Perčinlić
Jelena Perić
Petikat
Ordan Petlevski
Ivan Picelj
Viktor Popović
Puma 34
Nika Radić
Kosta Angeli Radovani 
Lala Raščić
Božidar Rašica
Josip Restek
Vjenceslav Richter
Igor Rončević
Igor Ruf
Silvo Šarić
Tomo Gecan Savic
Edita Schubert
Đuro Seder
Frano Šimunović
Sofija Silvia 
Damir Sokić
Aleksandar Srnec
Miljenko Stančić
Mladen Stilinović
Damir Stojnić
Miroslav Šutej
Marko Tadić
Slaven Tolj
Goran Trbuljak
Marija Ujević-Galetović 
Nikola Ukić
Viktor Vasarely
Zlatan Vehabović
Matko Vekić
Mirjana Vodopija
Zlatan Vrkljan
Silvio Vujičić
Vlasta Žanić

Recent history of the Filip Trade Collection

2001
10 years of the Filip Trade Collection, exhibition and publication in association with the Croatian Association of Artists, Zagreb.
2002
Filip Trade Award, winner David Maljković for the work State of Paintings – Independent Form.
Filip Trade Collection, exhibition and publication in Gallery Manes, Prague.
2003
Filip Trade Award, winner Matko Vekić for the work The Sheep That Did Not Get Lost. 
2004
Image and Object, exhibition and publication in the Art Gallery Dubrovnik, Dubrovnik.
The Repository, exhibition and publication, Ex - TKZ,  Zagreb.
Filip Trade Award, winner Kristian Kožul for the work Golden Collection.
2005
Filip Trade Award, winner Viktor Popović for the work No Title.
2006
64, exhibition in Gallery Josip Račić, Zagreb.
12R37, exhibition, publication and posters in the Komiža City Library, Island of Vis (island).
2007 – 2008
Project Linienstrasse113, exhibitions and web site, Berlin.  
2008
 L.A. Unfinished, Promotion of the film by Igor Mirković in Cinema Europe. 
A Different Motovun, exhibition and blog, at the Motovun Film Festival, Motovun. 
2009
 Finalists, Exhibition, publication and web site, Labin City Gallery (Sabina Salamon), Labin.  
Why So Serious?, exhibition and artist book by Puma 34: Data book on Hydrocarbons at the Motovun Film Festival, Motovun. 
This exhibition is dedicated to our grandfather K.P., exhibition and promotion of artist book: Data book on Hydrocarbons, in association with the Croatian Designers Association, Zagreb.  
2010
In Person, exhibition and web site at the Motovun Film Festival, Motovun.

Notes and references

External links
Lauba website
Linienstrasse 113 Project website
U Drugom Filmu exhibition blog spot
Finalisti exhibition website
Glavom i Bradom exhibition website

Croatian contemporary art
Private collections in Croatia